William Beesley VC (5 October 1895 – 23 September 1966) was an English recipient of the Victoria Cross, the highest and most prestigious award for gallantry in the face of the enemy that can be awarded to British and Commonwealth forces.

Life
Beesley was 22 years old, and a private in the 13th Battalion, The Rifle Brigade (Prince Consort's Own), British Army during the First World War when the following deed took place for which he was awarded the VC.

On 8 May 1918 at Bucquoy, France, when Private Beesley's platoon sergeant and all the section commanders were killed he took command. Single-handed he rushed a post, shot four of the enemy, took six prisoners and sent them back to his lines. He and a comrade then brought his Lewis gun into action, inflicting many casualties and holding their position for four hours until the second private was wounded. Private Beesley, by himself, maintained his position until nightfall, when he returned to the original line with the wounded man and the Lewis gun which he kept in action until things had quietened down.

He later achieved the rank of sergeant.

His Victoria Cross is displayed at the Royal Green Jackets (Rifles) Museum in Winchester, England.

References

Monuments to Courage (David Harvey, 1999)
The Register of the Victoria Cross (This England, 1997)
VCs of the First World War - Spring Offensive 1918 (Gerald Gliddon, 1997)

External links
Location of grave and VC medal (Warwickshire)

1895 births
1966 deaths
People from Church Gresley
Rifle Brigade soldiers
British Army personnel of World War I
British World War I recipients of the Victoria Cross
King's Royal Rifle Corps soldiers
Royal Artillery soldiers
British Army personnel of World War II
British Army recipients of the Victoria Cross
Military personnel from Derbyshire